This article is a collection of statewide public opinion polls that have been conducted relating to the April, May, and June Democratic presidential primaries, 2008.

Pennsylvania
Pennsylvania winner: Hillary Clinton
Format: Primary see: Pennsylvania Democratic primary, 2008
Date: April 22, 2008
Delegates at stake 188
Delegates won To be determined

Tracking Polls

Polls

Indiana
 Indiana winner: Hillary Clinton
Format: Primary see: Indiana Democratic primary, 2008
Date: 6 May 2008
Delegates at stake 72
Delegates won To be determined

The sample set for some polls in this table is not unique and overlaps with polls from previous days.  These polls are marked as  Tracking Polls.

Indiana Tracking polls

North Carolina
: Barack Obama
Format: Primary see: North Carolina Democratic primary, 2008
Date: 6 May 2008
Delegates at stake 115
Delegates won To be determined

The sample set for some polls in this table is not unique and overlaps with polls from previous days. These polls are marked as  Tracking Polls.

North Carolina Tracking polls

West Virginia
 West Virginia winner: Hillary Clinton
Format: Primary see: West Virginia Democratic primary, 2008
Date: May 13, 2008
Delegates at stake 28
Delegates won To be determined

Kentucky
 Kentucky winner: Hillary Clinton
Format: Primary see: Kentucky Democratic primary, 2008
Date: 20 May 2008
Delegates at stake 51
Delegates won To be determined

Oregon
 Oregon winner: Barack Obama
Format: Mail-only Primary see: Oregon Democratic primary, 2008
Dates: May 2–20, 2008
Delegates at stake 52
Delegates won To be determined

Puerto Rico
 Puerto Rico winner: Hillary Clinton
Format: Primary see: Puerto Rico Democratic primary, 2008
Date: June 1, 2008
Delegates at stake 55
Delegates won To be determined

South Dakota
 South Dakota winner: Hillary Clinton
Format: Primary see: South Dakota Democratic primary, 2008
Date: June 3, 2008
Delegates at stake 15
Delegates won To be determined

Montana
 Montana winner: Barack Obama
Format: Primary see: Montana Democratic primary, 2008
Date: June 3, 2008
Delegates at stake 16
Delegates won To be determined

2008 United States Democratic presidential primaries
Democratic